is a Japanese horror anime television series centered around scientist Sōsuke Banba and his encounters with Unidentified Mysterious Animals or "UMAs". The series of shorts premiered on 2 October 2015 on Tokyo MX and BS11 as part of the Ultra Super Anime Time programming block. The series was simulcast by Crunchyroll. A second season titled Kagewani: Shō aired from 1 April 2016 to 24 June 2016.

Premise
The story begins when cryptids suddenly appear and attack humans. The scientist Sōsuke Banba pursues the truth about these "UMAs".

Voice cast
 Tomokazu Sugita as Sōsuke Banba
 Ryōtarō Okiayu as Masaki Kimura
 Mai Aizawa
 Yukinori Okuhata
 Yûsuke Handa
 Fumiya Kosugi
 Yukiko Morishita

Episode list

Season 1 (2015)

Season 2 (2016)

Production
The series is directed by Tomoya Takashima and written by Hiromu Kumamoto, with animation by animation studio Tomovies. Character designs for the series are provided by Ami Fujikawa and Ryōma Hori, and the monster designs are provided Shunsaku Matsurida. Tsutomu Nagae and Kentarō Iwakiri are producing the series. The series' theme song is "Arrival of Fear" by M.S.S Project.

References

External links
 
 

Cryptozoological television series
Horror anime and manga
Suspense anime and manga
Tokyo MX original programming